Sci-Hub is a shadow library website that provides free access to millions of research papers and books, without regard to copyright, by bypassing publishers' paywalls in various ways. Sci-Hub was founded in Kazakhstan by Alexandra Elbakyan in 2011, in response to the high cost of research papers behind paywalls (see Serials crisis). The site is extensively used worldwide. In September 2019, the site's owners said that it served approximately 400,000 requests per day. Sci-Hub has been estimated to contain 95% of all scholarly publications with issued DOI numbers. Sci-Hub reported on 15 July 2022 that its collection comprises 88,343,822 files.

Sci-Hub and Elbakyan were sued twice for copyright infringement in the United States, in 2015 and 2017, and lost both cases by default, leading to loss of some of its Internet domain names. The site has cycled through different domain names since then.

Sci-Hub has been lauded by some in the scientific, academic, and publishing communities for providing access to knowledge generated by the scientific community, which is usually funded by taxpayers (government grants) and with zero royalties paid to the authors. Publishers have criticized it for violating copyright, reducing the revenue of publishers, and potentially being linked to activities compromising universities' network security, though the cybersecurity threat posed by Sci-Hub may have been exaggerated by publishers.
Elbakyan responded by questioning the morality of the publishers' business and the legality of their methods in regards to the right to science and culture under Article 27 of the Universal Declaration of Human Rights, while maintaining that Sci-Hub should be "perfectly legal."

Since 2021, regular new content uploads to the site have been frozen and some new articles are not available except for some batch releases of content. Elbakyan made the decision to freeze new uploads as a requirement of the court case Sci-Hub is defending against Elsevier in India.

On 26 January 2023 the Sci-Hub SE domain name was reported to have been taken down. Elbakyan said she did not expect reinstatement of the SE domain and referred followers to the alternative .ru domain instead.

A 2023 study has found that more than 50% of academics admit to using websites like Sci-Hub to avoid paywalls.

History

Sci-Hub was created by Alexandra Elbakyan, who was born in Kazakhstan in 1988. Elbakyan earned her undergraduate degree at Kazakh National Technical University studying information technology, then worked for a year for a computer security firm in Moscow, then joined a research team at the University of Freiburg in Germany in 2010 that was working on a brain–computer interface. She then became interested in transhumanism and after attending a transhumanism conference in the United States, Elbakyan spent her remaining time in the country doing a research internship at Georgia Institute of Technology.

She later returned to Kazakhstan, where she started research in a Kazakh university. According to Elbakyan, she experienced difficulty accessing scientific papers relevant to her research project. She began contributing to online forums dedicated to sharing research papers. In 2011, she developed Sci-Hub to automatically share papers. The site was launched on September 5, 2011.

In May 2021, Sci-Hub users collaborated to preserve the website's data, anticipating that the site may go offline. In September 2021, the site celebrated the tenth anniversary of its launch date by uploading on that single day over 2.3 million articles to its database.

In November 2022, a group of anonymous archivists launched Anna's Archive, a free non-profit online shadow library metasearch engine (purportedly via IPFS) providing access to a variety of book resources. The team claims to provide metadata access to Open Library materials, to be a backup of the Library Genesis, Sci-Hub, and Z-Library shadow libraries, presents ISBN information, has no copyrighted materials on its website, and only indexes metadata that is already publicly available.

On 17 February 2023, a court in India, related to a lawsuit brought by publishers, was reported to have failed to dismiss a blocking application submitted by the legal representatives of Sci-Hub; nonetheless, these legal representatives may follow up this court action with proceedings based on other, perhaps more promising, legal strategies. Additionally, the revoked .SE domain of Sci-Hub, in a different court case, has now been restored due to a successful "ownership verification process."

Legal status 

Sci-Hub has cycled through domain names, some of which have been blocked by domain registry operators. Sci-Hub remained reachable via alternative domains such as .io, then .cc, and .bz. Sci-Hub has also been accessible at times by directly entering the IP address, or through a .onion Tor Hidden Service.

On 8 January 2021, Twitter suspended Sci-Hub's account citing "counterfeit content" as the reason.

United States 
In 2015, Elsevier filed a lawsuit against Sci-Hub, in Elsevier et al. v. Sci-Hub et al., at the United States District Court for the Southern District of New York. Library Genesis (LibGen) was also a defendant in the case, which may be based in either the Netherlands or in Russia. It was the largest copyright infringement case that had been filed in the U.S., or in the world, at the time. Elsevier alleged that Sci-Hub violated copyright law and induced others to do so, and it alleged violations of the Computer Fraud and Abuse Act as well as inducements to violate that law. Elsevier asked for monetary damages and an injunction to stop the sharing of the papers. Elsevier has used accusations over the alleged security threat that Sci-Hub poses to institutions to encourage educational institutions to block its use.

Elbakyan responded to the case in an interview by accusing Elsevier of violating the right to science and culture under Article 27 of the Universal Declaration of Human Rights. She later wrote a letter to the court about the case describing her reasons for creating Sci-Hub, in which she stated, "Payment of 32 dollars [for each download] is just insane when you need to skim or read tens or hundreds of these papers to do research."

At the time the website was hosted in St. Petersburg, Russia, where judgments made by American courts were not enforceable, and Sci-Hub did not defend the lawsuit. In June 2017, the court awarded Elsevier US$15 million in damages for copyright infringement by Sci-Hub and others in a default judgment. The judgment found that Sci-Hub used accounts of students and academic institutions to access articles through Elsevier's platform ScienceDirect. The judgment also granted the injunction, which led to the loss of the original sci-hub.org domain.

In June 2017, the American Chemical Society (ACS) filed a lawsuit against Sci-Hub in the United States District Court for the Eastern District of Virginia, alleging copyright and trademark infringement; it sought judgment US$4.8 million from Sci-Hub in damages, and Internet service provider blocking of the Sci-Hub website. On 6 November 2017, the ACS was granted a default judgment, and a permanent injunction was granted against all parties in active concert or participation with Sci-Hub that has notice of the injunction, "including any Internet search engines, web hosting and Internet service providers, domain name registrars, and domain name registries," to cease facilitating access to the service. On 23 November 2017, four Sci-Hub domains had been rendered inactive by the court order and its CloudFlare account was terminated.

Since 2018, the White House Office of the U.S. Trade Representative has cited Sci-Hub as one of the most flagrant "notorious market" sites in the world.

Sweden 
In October 2018, Swedish ISPs were forced to block access to Sci-Hub after a court case brought by Elsevier; Bahnhof, a large Swedish ISP, in return soft-blocked the Elsevier website. On 26 January 2023, the Sci-Hub SE domain name is reported to have been taken down. According to the news, Alexandra Elbakyan, Sci-Hub founder, doesn't expect reinstatement of the SE domain and refers followers to the alternative RU domain name instead.

Russia 
In November 2018, Russia's Federal Service for Supervision of Communications, Information Technology and Mass Media blocked Sci-Hub and its mirror websites after a Moscow City Court ruling to comply with Elsevier's and Springer Nature's complaints regarding intellectual property infringement. The site moved to another domain and is still available online as of 22 January 2022.

France 
On 7 March 2019, following a complaint by Elsevier and Springer Nature, a French court ordered French ISPs to block access to Sci-Hub and Library Genesis. However, the court order did not affect the academic network Renater, through which most French academic access to Sci-Hub presumably goes.

Belgium 
Following the lawsuit by Elsevier in March 2019 in France, Elsevier, Springer, John Wiley, and Cambridge University Press filed a complaint against Proximus, VOO, Brutélé, and Telenet to block access to Sci-Hub and LibGen. The publishers claimed to represent more than half of the scientific publishing sector and indicated that over 90% of the contents on the sites infringed copyright laws; they won the lawsuit. Since then, the two sites are blocked by those ISPs; visitors are redirected to a stop page by Belgian Federal Police instead, citing illegality of the site's content under Belgian legislation.

The European Commission included Sci-Hub in its "Piracy Watch List."

India 
In December 2020, Elsevier, Wiley and the American Chemical Society filed a copyright infringement lawsuit against Sci-Hub and Library Genesis in the Delhi High Court. The plaintiffs seek a dynamic injunction which means that any future domain, IP, or name-change by the respondents will not require the plaintiffs to return to court for an additional injunction. The court restricted the sites from uploading, publishing, or making any article available until 6 January 2021. In response to the lawsuit, as well as to Elbakyan's claim that the FBI had requested data from her Apple account, Reddit users on the subreddit r/DataHoarder organized to download and seed backups of the articles on Sci-Hub, with the intention of creating a decentralized and uncensorable version of the site.

The High Court agreed on 6 January 2021 to wait before passing any interim order in the case until they hear representations from scientists, researchers, and students. A hearing was scheduled for 16 December 2021. A key component of Sci-Hub's legal defence is that it provides educational resources to researchers and thus falls under a fair dealing exception in India's copyright law. This defence has previously been used by educational institutions to justify the reproduction of copyrighted materials for use by low-income students. A number of Indian academics have offered support to Sci-Hub after the lawsuit was filed. Multiple petitions were filed by scholars in India supporting Sci-Hub in the lawsuit. The case was ongoing as of November 2022.

United Kingdom 
In February 2021, Elsevier and Springer Nature obtained an injunction on TalkTalk to block the sci-hub.se domain as a result of a ruling handed down by a UK court. In March 2021, City of London police's Intellectual Property Crime Unit issued a warning to students and universities against accessing the website and to have the website blocked by universities with allegations that the website could steal credentials, mainly to download content from publishers and cause users to "inadvertently download potentially dangerous content" when visited. However, the allegation was denied by Elbakyan.

Website 
The site's operation is financed by user donations. The PHP code, setup of the Linux web servers, and maintenance are all done by Elbakyan herself to avoid risk of moles or a broken team compromising the service. Over the years, various URL addresses and direct IP addresses have been used for Sci-Hub, as dozens of domain names have been confiscated by various legal authorities.

Article sourcing
Sci-Hub obtains paywalled articles using leaked credentials. The source of the credentials used by Sci-Hub is unclear. Some appear to have been donated, some were apparently sold before going to Sci-Hub, and some appear to have been obtained via phishing and were then used by Sci-Hub. Elbakyan denied personally sending any phishing emails and said, "The exact source of the passwords was never personally important to me."

According to The Scholarly Kitchen, a blog established by the Society for Scholarly Publishing whose members are involved in legal action against Sci-Hub, credentials used by Sci-Hub to access paywalled articles are correlated to access of other information on university networks (such as cyber spying on universities) and credential sales in black markets. Several articles have reported that Sci-Hub has penetrated the computer networks of more than 370 universities in 39 countries. These include more than 150 institutions in the U.S., more than 30 in Canada, 39 in the UK, and more than 10 in Sweden. The universities in the UK include Cambridge, Oxford, Imperial, and King's College, London.

Delivery to users
The Sci-Hub website provides access to articles from almost all academic publishers, including Elsevier, Springer/Nature, Institute of Electrical and Electronics Engineers, American Chemical Society, Wiley Blackwell, and the Royal Society of Chemistry, as well as open-access works, and distributes them without regard to publishers' copyrights. It requires neither payments, nor subscriptions, nor registrations.

Users can access works from all sources with a unified interface by entering the DOI in the search bar on the main page or in the Sci-Hub URL (like some academic link resolvers), or by appending the Sci-Hub domain to the domain of a publisher's URL (like some academic proxies). Sci-Hub redirects requests for some gold open access works, identified as such beyond the metadata available in CrossRef and Unpaywall. Some requests require the user to enter a CAPTCHA. Papers can also be accessed using a bot in the instant messaging service Telegram.

If the paper is in the repository already, the request is served immediately. If the paper is not already in the repository, a wait screen appears while the site presents someone else's credentials on behalf of the user to a series of proxies until it finds one that has access to the paper, which is then presented to the user and stored in the repository.

Until the end of 2014, Sci-Hub relied on LibGen as storage: papers requested by users were requested from LibGen and served from there if available, otherwise they were fetched by other means and then stored on LibGen. The permanent storage made it possible to serve more users than the previous system of deleting the cached content after 6 hours.

Since 2015, Sci-Hub uses its own storage for the same purpose. As of 2017, Sci-Hub was continuing to redirect requests for electronic books to Libgen.

After the site faced increased legal pressure in 2021, archivists initiated a rescue mission to secure enduring access to the website and its contents. They organized on a Reddit website to coordinate decentralized storage and delivery of Sci-Hub contents using BitTorrent technology.

Usage and content statistics 

Elbakyan has released download request logs from Sci-Hub servers covering periods from 2011-2013, 2015-2016, and 2017. Studies of the 2017 Sci-Hub download logs indicated that:

 less than 1% of all journals contribute to over 50% of all downloads while 50% of the least popular journals contribute to ca. 1% of all downloads. Similar statistics are obtained when the downloads are normalized per article rather than per journal. Such data allowed academic libraries to negotiate reduced subscription costs or cut altogether less popular journals from big deal contracts. 
 only 11% of all journal publishers are highly requested, while 45% of all publishers are significantly less accessed. Despite this, the oligopoly of publishers is even more remarkable on the level of content consumption, with 80% of all downloads being published through only 9 publishers.
 1/3 of all articles downloaded were published by Elsevier, which published ca. 24% of all journal articles.
 In 2017, Sci-Hub provided a more reliable access to legal open access articles, that the journal publishers, which have been prone to "unresolvable DOI's due to issues on publishers’ sides" and to "Open Access publications that disappear behind accidental paywalls." 
 Of 27.8 million download requests via Sci-Hub, 23.2 million of these were for journal articles, 4.7 million (22%) of which were articles from medical journals. The requests for medical literature came mostly from middle- and low-income countries (69%); the countries with the most requests in absolute numbers were India, China, the U.S., Brazil, and Iran. Another 2022 study lent evidence to the argument that the free access to scholarly articles that Sci-Hub provides to developing countries is measurably beneficial to the research conducted in those countries themselves.
In February 2016, the website claimed to serve over 200,000 requests per day—an increase from an average of 80,000 per day before the "sci-hub.org" domain was blocked in 2015.

Server log data gathered from September 2015 to February 2016 and released by Elbakyan in 2016 revealed some usage information. A large amount of Sci-Hub's user activity came from American and European university campuses, and when adjusted for population, usage of Sci-Hub was high for developed countries. However, a large proportion of download requests came from developing countries such as Iran, China, India, Russia, Brazil, and Egypt. User activity covered all branches of science, engineering, medicine, and humanities.

In March 2017, the website had 62 million papers in its collection, which were found to include 85% of the articles published in paywalled scholarly journals. Although only 69% of all published articles were in the database in March 2017, it has been estimated, based on scholarly citations from articles published between 2015 and July 2017, that at least 96% of requests for paywalled articles are successful.

On 27 July 2020, the Sci-Hub website reported that the cumulative number of downloads from the database exceeded one billion, that the average number of downloads per day was 300,000–600,000, and that the database continued its expansion into the pre-digital age, particularly into journal articles published prior to 1980. Among achievements in 2019, Sci-Hub reported the publication of about 15,000 letters by Charles Darwin, most of which were not available free of charge, although their copyrights had expired over 100 years previously. In 2019, Elbakyan also reported plans to allow access to Supplemental Information of journal articles in addition to the main texts, which are already available.

In 2019, in the context of the big deal cancellations by several library systems in the world, the wide usage of Sci-Hub was credited as one of the factors that reduced the apparent value of the subscriptions to toll access resources.

User location 

A 2016 analysis of 28 million requests to Sci-Hub published in Science with the title Who's downloading pirated papers? Everyone shows a map of Sci-Hub users with dots all over the world.

A 2020 a study by researchers from 4 countries on 3 continents found that articles downloaded from Sci-Hub were cited 1.72 times more than papers not downloaded from Sci-Hub; the study's methods and conclusions were disputed by Phil Davis in a Scholarly Kitchen article.

In a 2021 study conducted by the National Institute of Science, Technology and Development Studies, and Banaras Hindu University on the use of Sci-Hub in India, 13,144,241 out of 150,575,861 download requests in 2017 were found to have come from Indian IP addresses. Of the research papers downloaded in India, 1,050,62, or 18.46%, of these are already available in some form of open access. Indian users requested an average of 39,952 downloads per day from Sci-Hub in 2017.

A 2018 study found a relatively low use of Sci-Hub in China. This was attributed to blocking of many Sci-Hub hosting sites by Cyberspace Administration of China and the existence of a Chinese twin of Sci-Hub, which is not accessible outside of China and is unknown to Western publishers. However, the situation in PR China changed in the next 3 years, and the data released by Elbakyan in February 2022 show China having the largest number of downloads of any country. 

An analysis of locational data from January 2022 indicated that researchers worldwide are accessing papers using Sci-Hub. China, which topped the chart, had more than 25 million downloads in a month. The U.S. was the second largest (ca. 38% of PRC downloads), and France the third largest (24% of the U.S.). India had the second-highest number of individual users but only ranked fifth in downloads. This study only assessed downloads from the original Sci-Hub websites and excluded replica or "mirror" sites. It therefore did not count downloads from places where the original domain is banned (e.g. the UK). Furthermore. the use of VPN can skew some results (e.g. possibly India).

Archiving of scientific research 
Sci-Hub effectively does academic archiving outside the bounds of contemporary copyright law, and, unlike Web archiving initiatives such as the Internet Archive, also provides access to academic works that do not have an open access license. There are data dumps of papers available on Sci-Hub.

In response to the COVID-19 pandemic, a group of online archivists have used Sci-Hub to create an archive of over 5,000 articles about coronaviruses. They admit that making the archive openly accessible is illegal but consider it a moral imperative.

Reception
Association of College & Research Libraries (ACRL) Conference in Baltimore, MD (22-24 Mar 2017
Sci-Hub's interface is perceived by users as providing a superior user experience and convenience compared to the typical interfaces available to users who have access to a paid subscription.

In December 2022, in the journal Information Development, an academic researcher survey found, when confronted by a paywall, they try to find an open-access version, then ask colleagues with other credentials, then use shadow libraries. 57% of respondents of have used shadow libraries. 36% of respondents were unaware that shadow libraries exist.

Sci-Hub has been lauded as having "changed how we access knowledge." It raised awareness about the scientific publishing business models and its ethics of making researchers' institutions pay for their articles to be published, while providing and reviewing them without payment.

Support for open-access science publishing extends beyond Sci-Hub; Plan S is an initiative launched by Science Europe on 4 September 2018. It is an initiative of "cOAlition S," a consortium launched by major national research agencies and funders from twelve European countries. The plan requires scientists and researchers who benefit from state-funded research organisations and institutions to publish their work in open repositories or in journals that are available to all by 2021. The initiative is not a law.

Scientists in some European countries began negotiations with Elsevier and other academic publishers on introducing national open access.

Publishers have been critical of Sci-Hub, some claiming that it is undermining more widely accepted open-access initiatives and that it ignores how publishers "work hard" to make access for third-world nations easier. It has also been criticized by librarians for compromising universities' network security and jeopardizing legitimate access to papers by university staff. The cybersecurity threat posed by Sci-Hub has been questioned and the suggestion made that the threat has been exaggerated by large publishers keen to protect their business model by discrediting Sci-Hub or pushing universities to block students access to Sci-Hub. Moreover, even prominent Western institutions such as Harvard and Cornell have had to cut down their access to publications due to ever-increasing subscription costs, potentially causing some of the highest use of Sci-Hub to be in American cities with well-known universities (this may, however, be due to the convenience of the site rather than a lack of access). Sci-Hub can be seen as one venue in a general trend in which research is becoming more accessible. Many academics, university librarians, and longtime advocates for open scholarly research believe Elbakyan is "giving academic publishers their Napster moment," referring to the illegal music-sharing service that "disrupted and permanently altered the industry."
For her actions in creating Sci-Hub, Elbakyan has been called a hero and "spiritual successor to Aaron Swartz," who in 2010 downloaded millions of academic articles from JSTOR. She has also been compared to Edward Snowden. She has also been called a "Robin Hood of science."

Elbakyan responded by attacking "a double-dipping model, that benefits only to publishers while creating an illusion of conformance with the Open Access goals," in a reference to hybrid open-access journals run by legacy publishers (like Elsevier and ACS), which charge APCs for some articles to make them gratis open access, while still selling subscriptions and other licenses to access the same journals.

In August 2016, the Association of American Publishers sent a letter to Gabriel J. Gardner, a researcher at California State University who has written papers on Sci-Hub and similar sites. The letter asked Gardner to stop promoting the site, which he had discussed at a session of a meeting of the American Library Association. In response, the publishing institution was highly criticized for trying to silence legitimate research into the topic, and the letter has since been published in full and responded to by the dean of library services at Cal State Long Beach, who supported Gardner's work.

In December 2016, Nature Publishing Group named Elbakyan as one of the ten people who most mattered in science in 2016.

During the 2022 Russian invasion of Ukraine, TorrentFreak said that Sci-Hub is the only option for academics in Russia to access to research articles, as fifteen major publishers suspended services in Russia.

See also

 Anna's Archive
 #ICanHazPDF
 Guerilla Open Access Manifesto
 12ft.io
 Library.nu
 Open access
 The Pirate Bay
 ResearchGate

Further reading
 Alexandra Elbakyan. Why Science is Better with Communism? The Case of Sci-Hub (transcript and translation), Open Access Symposium 2016, University of North Texas (Archived from the original, 2016-07-24)
 (PDF)
  (Archived from the original)
 Houle, Louis (2017) Sci-Hub and LibGen: what if… why not? Paper presented at: International Federation of Library Associations and Institutions WLIC 2017 – Wrocław, Poland – Libraries. Solidarity. Society. in Session S12 - Satellite Meeting: Serials and Other Continuing Resources Section and Acquisition and Collection Development. In: Open Access: Action Required, 16 – 17 August 2017, Gdańsk (Poland).

Explanatory notes

References

External links
 Nexus - Academic searcher

Academic publishing
File sharing communities
Intellectual property activism
Internet properties established in 2011
Open access projects
Science websites
Search engine software
Tor onion services
Shadow libraries